Nabil Medjahed (born 3 January 1977) is a French-born Algerian football manager.

References

1977 births
Living people
French football managers
Algerian football managers
NA Hussein Dey managers
ASM Oran managers
RC Kouba managers
Algerian Ligue Professionnelle 1 managers
21st-century Algerian people